Robert Doyle (born 1953) is an Australian politician and the 103rd Lord Mayor of Melbourne.

Robert Doyle may also refer to:

 Robert Morris Doyle (1853–1925), rear admiral in the United States Navy
 Robert B. Doyle, Canadian judge
 Robert Doyle (footballer) (born 1951), Australian rules footballer

See also
 Bob Doyle (disambiguation)
 Bobby Doyle (disambiguation)